The Crime of Sylvestre Bonnard (French: Le crime de Sylvestre Bonnard) is a 1929 French silent drama film directed by André Berthomieu and starring Émile Matrat, Thérèse Kolb and Gina Barbieri. It is based on the 1881 novel The Crime of Sylvestre Bonnard by Anatole France.

Cast
 Émile Matrat as Sylvestre Bonnard  
 Thérèse Kolb as Thérèse  
 Gina Barbieri as Mlle. Préfière  
 Charles Lamy as Le Mouche  
 André Laurent as Gélis  
 Paul Ollivier as M. de Gabry  
 Germaine Noizet as Mme. de Gabry  
 Simone Bourday as Jeanne Alexandre 
 Julien Bertheau 
 Georges Deneubourg 
 Gabrielle Fontan 
 Jeanne Fusier-Gir

References

Bibliography
 Goble, Alan. The Complete Index to Literary Sources in Film. Walter de Gruyter, 1999.

External links

1929 films
1929 drama films
French drama films
Films directed by André Berthomieu
French silent feature films
French black-and-white films
Silent drama films
1920s French films